The Type A is an electric multiple unit (EMU) train type formerly operated on the Hamburg U-Bahn system. They were the first type of subway cars in Hamburg, entering service on 15 February 1912, and were later designated as Type T. Some cars were converted to maintenance service cars.

Variants

Type A and Type T
Type A cars, later designated as Type T, had wooden car bodies and two manually operated sliding doors per side. Seating accommodation consisted of a mix of longitudinal and transverse seats. Some cars were equipped with two cabs. The last Type T car was withdrawn in 1970.

Type TU1 and TU2
Some cars damaged during World War II were rebuilt with new car bodies and electro-pneumatic doors. These cars rebuilt between 1947 and 1953 were initially redesignated as Type B, but were later designated as Type TU1. 100 cars underwent refurbishment from 1959 until 1961 and received stainless steel paneling and rebuilt car ends, and were designated as Type TU2.

Preserved examples
T1 car 11: built by Waggonfabrik Falkenried in 1911
T1 car 18: built by Waggonfabrik Falkenried in 1911
T1 car 8040 (formerly 177): built in 1914, later used as a track maintenance car
T6 car 220: built by Waggonfabrik Falkenried in 1920
TU1 car 8838: built by Siemens-Schuckert Werke and Waggonfabrik Gebr. Credé & Co. in 1927
TU2 car 8762: built by AEG and Waggonfabrik Gebr. Credé & Co. in 1929

References

External links

 Detailed information about subway cars of the Hamburg U-Bahn - hochbahnbuch.de 

Hamburg U-Bahn
Electric multiple units of Germany
750 V DC multiple units
Siemens multiple units